Marián Miezga (born 31 October 1974) is a Slovak actor. He was recognised at the 1998 DOSKY Awards as Discovery of the Year as part of the performance of Na koho to slovo padne. Although mainly known for his television roles on Slovak TV channels RTVS and TV JOJ, he joined the cast of Markíza's Oteckovia in 2018 as Juraj Šípka.

Selected filmography 
S.O.S. (television, 2004)
Panelák (television, 2008–2014)
Mesto tieňov (television, 2008)
Partička (television, 2009)
Oteckovia (television, 2018)
 (2019)

References

External links

1974 births
Actors from Bratislava
Living people
Slovak male film actors
Slovak male stage actors
Slovak male television actors
Male voice actors
20th-century Slovak male actors
21st-century Slovak male actors